Rairakhol (Sl. No.: 18) is a Vidhan Sabha constituency of Sambalpur district, Odisha.

This constituency includes Rairakhol, Rairakhol block, Jujomura block, Naktideul block and 7GPs (Deogaon, Dakara, Dhama, Huma, Bargaon, Sahaspur and Baduapali) of Maneswar block.

Elected Members

Fifteen elections held during 1967 to 2019. List of members elected from Rairakhol constituency are:

2019: (18): Rohit Pujari (BJD) 
2014: (18): Rohit Pujari (BJD) 
2009: (18): Prasanna Acharya (BJD) 
2004: (133): Sanatan Bishi (BJD) 
2000: (133): Sanatan Bishi (BJD)
1995: (133): Abhimanyu Kumbhar (Congress)
1990: (133): Basant Kumar Mahananda (Janata Dal)
1985: (133): Abhimanyu Kumbhar (Congress)
1980: (133): Abhimanyu Kumbhar (Congress-I)
1977: (133): Basant Kumar Mahananda (Janata Party)
1974: (133): Basant Ku. Mahananda (Utkal Congress)
1971: (119): Abhimanyu Kumbhar (Orissa Jana Congress)
1967: (119): Bhikari Suna (Swatantra Party)
1961: (59): Raja Bhanu Ganga Tribhubana Deba (Ganatantra Parishad) 
1951: (33): Shraddhakar Supakar (Ganatantra Parishad)

2019 Election Result
In 2019 election, Biju Janata Dal candidate Rohit Pujari defeated Indian National Congress candidate Assaf Ali Khan by a margin of 14,632 votes.

2014 Election Result
In 2014 election, Biju Janata Dal candidate Rohit Pujari defeated Indian National Congress candidate Assaf Ali Khan by a margin of 11,909 votes.

2009 Election Result
In 2009 election Biju Janata Dal candidate Prasanna Acharya, defeated Indian National Congress candidate Asaf Ali Khan by a margin of 9,764 votes.

Notes

References

Sambalpur district
Assembly constituencies of Odisha